Korean monarchy existed in Korea until the end of the Japanese occupation and the defeat of Japan. After the independence and the installation of the Constitution that adopted republic system, the concept of nobility has been abolished, both formally and in practice.

Sources
As the Benedictines and other monastical orders did during Europe's Dark Ages, the Buddhist monks became the purveyors and guardians of Korea's literary traditions while documenting Korea's written history and legacies from the Silla period to the end of the Goryeo dynasty. Korean Buddhist monks also developed and used the first movable metal type printing presses in history—some 500 years before Gutenberg—to print ancient Buddhist texts. Buddhist monks also engaged in record keeping, food storage and distribution, as well as the ability to exercise power by influencing the Goryeo royal court.

Ruler and princely styles

Original titles
The monarchs of Goguryeo adopted the title of "Taewang", which placed them on the same level as the Chinese emperors. The literal translation of the title is the Supreme King. The early monarchs of Silla have used the title of "Geoseogan", "Chachaung", "Isageum", and finally "Maripgan" until 503. This follows from an earlier tradition when Korean kings were styled either Han or Kan, which are cognates of the Turkic khan. Marip originally meant the highest, and gan meant rulers. In addition, Baekje used the title of "Eoraha", "Ha" meaning "rulers" and "Eora" meaning "the largest".

Imperial titles

Goguryeo adopted the title, "Taewang" (태왕; 太王), meaning "Grandest of all Kings". 
Balhae and Goryeo monarchs adopted the title(s) Je (제; 帝), or emperor. However, unlike the Goguryeo, the imperial titles were not used in diplomatic campaigns with the prominent Chinese Dynasties of that time. Goryeo dropped its Imperial title for a short period after the peace treaty with the Mongols. It was later reinstated for a short while after the Goryeo dynasty defeated the Mongols in the 1360s.

The title was revived for less than two decades during the Korean Empire that came after Joseon.

Royal titles
Wang (Hangul: 왕; Hanja: 王) was a Chinese royal style used in many states rising from the dissolution of Gojoseon, Buyeo, Goguryeo, Baekje, Silla and Balhae, Goryeo. In late Goryeo (918-1392) and the Joseon Dynasty (until 1897) the rulers of Korea were still known as "wang", as evident in the title of King Sejong the Great. However, they were referred to by their temple names.

Although often translated in English as "king", this title also applied to a female ruler. Female rulers, equivalent to queen regnant in English, were informally referred to as yeowang (Hangul: 여왕; Hanja: 女王) meaning "female wang".

Wangbi (Hangul: 왕비; Hanja: 王妃) was title for the wife of the reigning king, equivalent to queen consort in English.

Prince
Gun (군; 君) is translated as "prince". The Royal Prince born of the Principal Royal consort (Queen) was designated Daegun, translated as the Grand Prince of the Blood. The princes born of concubine was given the title gun (often distinguished as wangja-gun), translated as the Prince of the Blood. The father of the king who himself has never reigned was given the special title of Daewongun (The Grand Prince of the Blood in the Court).

Those who has distinguished himself in the service of the court were also given the princely title as well. Buwongun (The Grand Prince of the Court), were the title of the father of the Queen, or those who have reached the rank of the Chief State Counsellor. Gun was the title of the meritorious subjects who reached the rank of the State Counsellor. These princes created for service had a prefix attached to the princely title, a town that a subject is affiliated to. Though designed as a titular appointment as a Lord of the area, the title was purely honorific.

The title gun can also refer to the dethroned rulers of Chosŏn dynasty as well. There were three dethroned kings to be called "Gun" in Joseon Dynasty (one restored to the dignity of king posthumously).

Under the Korean Empire (1897–1910), the Prince of the Blood was given the title of Chinwang. While the literal translation is the Imperial King of the Blood, a more appropriate title is the Imperial Prince of the Blood. Only four chinwang were appointed.

Aristocracy before Joseon

Silla
In Silla, the nobility was categorized by the Bone rank system.

Royal families split into two classes: sacred bone, which meant eligibility for the royal succession, and true bone, until the former was extinguished.

Non-royal nobles split into three classes: the 6th head rank, the 5th head rank and the 4th head rank; the 6th being the highest.

Goryeo
At the time of Goryeo, Korean nobility was divided into 6 classes.
 Gukgong (국공, 國公), Duke of a state
 Gungong (군공, 郡公), Duke of a county
 Hyeonhu (현후, 縣侯), Marquis of a town
 Hyeonbaek (현백, 縣伯), Count of a town
 Gaegukja (개국자, 開國子), Viscount of a town
 Hyeonnam (현남, 縣男), Baron of a town

Also the title Taeja (hangul: 태자, hanja: 太子) was given to sons of emperor not like other east Asian countries. In other countries, this title meant crown prince. Taeja was similar to Chinwang (hangul: 친왕, hanja: 親王) of the Korean Empire.

Noble families in Korea

Some clans whose social rank throughout Korean history could be considered equivalent to nobility are as follows (this is merely a sample and nowhere near the total list of families who attained and/or retained such social rank over the duration of Korea's lengthy history; families on this list are often also recognizable via their status during the Joseon era as yangban families).

List of Noble families in Korea, such as:
 House of Yi (Joseon Dynasty)
 House of Moon (East Tamna Dynasty, Jeju Island)
 House of Ko (West Tamna Dynasty, Jeju Island)
 House of Park (Silla Dynasty)
 Cheongju Han
 Gyeongju Yi
 Andong Kim
 Gimhae Kim
 Miryang Park
 Yeoheung Min
 Dalseong Seo
 Gyeongju Seok
 Pyeongyang Ko

Foreign noble families in Korea
The Chinese Ming Xia emperor Ming Yuzhen's son Ming Sheng was given the noble title Marquis of Guiyi by the Ming dynasty  Hongwu Emperor after his surrender. Ming Sheng was then exiled to Korea  at the age of 17 in 1372 by the Ming dynasty. The Korean official Yun Hui-chong's married his daughter off to Ming Sheng in March 1373. The emperor asked the Korean king to treat Ming Sheng as a foreign noble by giving his descendants and family corvée and taxation exemptions. These were granted by a patent from the Korean king which lasted until the invading soldiers in the Qing invasion of Joseon destroyed the Ming family's patents. The Chinese Ming family exists as the Korean clans, Yeonan Myeong clan, Seochok Myeong clan and Namwon Seung clan.

See also
Rulers of Korea
Bone rank system
Yangban
House of Yi
Styles and titles in the Joseon dynasty

References

External links 
 Almanach de Bruxelles (now a paying site)

 
Heads of state
History of Korea